Friar's Bush Graveyard is Belfast's oldest Christian burial site, located on the Stranmillis Road in South Belfast.

History
The mysterious Friar's stone in the cemetery bears the inscription AD 485. The oldest headstone in the cemetery was erected to the memory of Thomas Gibson who died in 1717. During the 1800s, the cemetery was repeatedly raided by body-snatchers, including in 1823 when the bodies of a woman and a child were stolen from the graveyard, although they were later returned.

The cemetery is the resting place of thousands of victims of the Cholera epidemic of the 1830s and the Great Irish famine of the 1840s. These people were buried in a mound dubbed 'Plaguey Hill', which is located just inside the cemetery's main gates. Also located inside the graveyard's main gates is the "Pauper's Pit", which is the resting place of those too poor to afford a headstone. By the mid 19th-century, the cemetery was becoming overcrowded, and only families with burial rights were allowed to be interred, and in 1869 it was replaced by Milltown Cemetery as the city's main Catholic burial site.

The graveyard is the resting place of the famed baker and philanthropist Bernard (Barney) Hughes who died in 1878.

Friar's Bush has been maintained by the Belfast City Council since 2000, having previously been owned by the Catholic Church.

See also
 Milltown Cemetery
 Shankill Graveyard

References

External links
 

Cemeteries in Belfast
Religion in Belfast
Roman Catholic cemeteries in Northern Ireland